The Social Democratic Party (SDP) was a centrist to centre-left political party in the United Kingdom. The party supported a mixed economy (favouring a system inspired by the German social market economy), electoral reform, European integration and a decentralised state while rejecting the possibility of trade unions being overly influential within the industrial sphere. The SDP officially advocated social democracy, but its actual propensity is evaluated as close to social liberalism.

The SDP was founded on 26 March 1981 by four senior Labour Party moderates, dubbed the "Gang of Four": Roy Jenkins, David Owen, Bill Rodgers, and Shirley Williams, who issued the Limehouse Declaration. Owen and Rodgers were sitting Labour Members of Parliament (MPs); Jenkins had left Parliament in 1977 to serve as President of the European Commission, while Williams had lost her seat in the 1979 general election.  All four had held cabinet experience in the 1970s before Labour lost power in 1979. The four left the Labour Party as a result of the January 1981 Wembley conference which committed the party to unilateral nuclear disarmament and withdrawal from the European Economic Community.  They also believed that Labour had become too left-wing, and had been infiltrated at constituency party level by Militant tendency whose views and behaviour they considered to be at odds with the Parliamentary Labour Party and Labour voters.

Shortly after its formation, the SDP formed a political and electoral alliance with the Liberal Party, the SDP–Liberal Alliance, which lasted through the 1983 and 1987 general elections. In 1988, the two parties merged, forming the Social and Liberal Democrats, later renamed the Liberal Democrats, although a minority, led by Owen, left to form a continuing SDP.

Origins
The origin of the party can be traced back to the ideological divisions in the Labour Party in the 1950s (with its forerunner being the Campaign for Democratic Socialism established to support the Gaitskellites), but publicly lies in the 1979 Dimbleby Lecture given by Roy Jenkins as he neared the end of his presidency of the European Commission. Jenkins argued the necessity for a realignment in British politics, and discussed whether this could be brought about from within the existing Liberal Party, or from a new group driven by European principles of social democracy.

There were long-running claims of corruption and administrative decay within Labour at local level (the North East of England was to become a cause célèbre),  and concerns that experienced and able Labour MPs could be deselected (i.e., lose the Labour Party nomination) by those wanting to put into a safe seat their friends, family or members of their own Labour faction. In some areas, the Militant tendency were held to be systematically targeting weak local party branches in safe seat areas in order to have their own candidates selected, and thus become MPs.

Eddie Milne at Blyth (Northumberland) and Dick Taverne in Lincoln were both victims of such intrigues during the 1970s, but in both cases there was enough of a local outcry by party members – and the electorate – for them to fight and win their seats as independent candidates against the official Labour candidates.

March 1973 Lincoln by-election

In Taverne's case, he had been fighting efforts by the Lincoln Constituency Labour Party to deselect him largely over his support for British membership of the European Communities. In October 1972 he resigned his seat to force a by-election in which he fought as a Democratic Labour candidate against the official party candidate. Taverne won by an unexpectedly large margin. He founded the short lived Campaign for Social Democracy (CFSD) thereafter, and wrote a book about events surrounding the by-election called The Future of the Left – Lincoln and After (1972). But the CFSD failed to gain nationwide support, and Taverne lost the seat at the October 1974 general election. Some independent Social Democrats contested the October 1974 and 1979 general elections, but none were elected.

Taverne's Lincoln by-election campaign was also helped to a lesser degree by problems with the Conservative and Unionist Party candidate, Conservative Monday Club chairman Jonathan Guinness. His suggestion during the by-election that murderers should have razor blades left in their cells so they could decently commit suicide resulted in him being nicknamed "Old Razor Blades" during the campaign. This, combined with considerable Conservative grassroots disquiet over the Monday Club's links to the National Front, persuaded some Conservative voters to switch to Taverne in protest as much as tactically to ensure Labour suffered an embarrassing loss. (Guinness had been elected as Chairman specifically to eradicate such links.)

Creation of the SDP
On 25 January 1981, leading figures from the Labour Party (Roy Jenkins, David Owen, Shirley Williams and Bill Rodgers, known collectively as the "Gang of Four") launched the Council for Social Democracy, after outlining their policies in what became known as the Limehouse Declaration. In March it was renamed the Social Democratic Party. The "Gang of Four" were centrists, who defected from the Labour Party due to what they perceived to be the influence of the Militant tendency and the "hard left" within the party.

Thirteen Labour MPs initially declared support for the Council for Social Democracy. On 20 February 1981, three of these Tom Ellis, Richard Crawshaw and Ian Wrigglesworth resigned the Labour whip and another, Tom Bradley, announced he would not contest his seat again as a Labour candidate. These moves were reported to be a clear move towards formally creating a new centre party. Former Labour Party deputy leader, Baron George-Brown also announced his membership of the Council for Social Democracy.

"Democratic", "Democratic Labour", and "Radical" were all mentioned as possible names for the new party, as well as "New Labour" (which future Labour Party leader and eventual Prime Minister Tony Blair would use to successfully promote the Labour Party more than a decade later) but eventually "Social Democratic" was settled on because the "Gang of Four" consciously wanted to mould the philosophy and ideology of the new party on the social democracy practised on mainland Europe.

The opening statement of principles contained in the preamble of the party's constitution stated that: "The SDP exists to create and defend an open, classless and more equal society which rejects prejudices based upon sex, race, colour or religion". The constitution set out the establishment of a "Council for Social Democracy" (CSD) which was, in effect, the party's standing conference. Each area party was entitled to elect delegates to the CSD. A number of internal groups flourished within the new party, the most notable of which was the Tawney Society (mirroring the function of the Fabian Society within the Labour Party).

Twenty-eight Labour MPs eventually joined the new party, along with one member of the Conservative Party, Christopher Brocklebank-Fowler, MP for North West Norfolk, who joined on 16 March 1981, a fortnight after the party's launch. Williams and Jenkins were not at the time Members of Parliament, but were elected to the House of Commons at by-elections in Crosby and Glasgow Hillhead respectively.

The defecting Labour MPs were:

 Tom Bradley (Leicester East) - joined new party on its launch, 2 March 1981
 Ronald Brown (Hackney South and Shoreditch) - joined on 2 December 1981
 John Cartwright (Woolwich East) - joined new party on its launch, 2 March 1981
 Richard Crawshaw (Liverpool Toxteth) - resigned Lab whip 20 February 1981, joined new party on its launch, 2 March 1981
 George Cunningham (Islington South and Finsbury) - resigned Lab whip 30 November 1981, joined on 16 June 1982
 Bruce Douglas-Mann (Mitcham and Morden, resigned his seat and lost the ensuing by-election) - joined on 11 December 1981
 James Dunn (Liverpool Kirkdale) - joined on 7 October 1981
 Tom Ellis (Wrexham) - resigned Lab whip 20 February 1981, joined new party on its launch, 2 March 1981
 David Ginsburg (Dewsbury) - joined on 6 October 1981
 John Grant (Islington Central) - joined on 16 November 1981
 John Horam (Gateshead West) - joined new party on its launch, 2 March 1981
 Ednyfed Hudson Davies (Caerphilly) - joined on 22 December 1981
 Edward Lyons (Bradford West) - joined on 19 March 1981
 Dr. Dickson Mabon (Greenock and Port Glasgow) - joined on 1 October 1981
 Bryan Magee (Leyton) - resigned Lab whip 22 January 1982, joined in March 1982
 Robert Maclennan (Caithness and Sutherland) - joined new party on its launch, 2 March 1981
 Tom McNally (Stockport South) - joined on 7 October 1981
 Bob Mitchell (Southampton Itchen) - joined on 5 October 1981
 Eric Ogden (Liverpool West Derby) - joined on 29 October 1981
 Michael O'Halloran (Islington North) - joined on 7 September 1981; subsequently resigned from SDP on 10 February 1983, after not being selected as a general election candidate
 David Owen (Plymouth Devonport) - joined new party on its launch, 2 March 1981
 William Rodgers (Stockton-on-Tees) - joined new party on its launch, 2 March 1981
 John Roper (Farnworth) - joined new party on its launch, 2 March 1981
 Neville Sandelson (Hayes and Harlington) - joined new party on its launch, 2 March 1981
 Jeffrey Thomas (Abertillery) - joined on 11 December 1981
 Mike Thomas (Newcastle East) - joined new party on its launch, 2 March 1981
 James Wellbeloved (Erith and Crayford) - joined on 4 July 1981
 Ian Wrigglesworth (Thornaby) - joined new party on its launch, 2 March 1981

Nine Labour members of the House of Lords also joined the SDP on its creation, eight of whom had previously held ministerial office. In a letter to Labour's leader Michael Foot, the defecting peers said they had taken their decision "with great sorrow". . They were:
 Herbert Bowden, Baron Aylestone
 Jack Diamond, Baron Diamond 
 John Harris, Baron Harris of Greenwich
 Henry Walston, Baron Walston
 Elaine Burton, Baroness Burton of Coventry
 Jack Donaldson, Baron Donaldson of Kingsbridge
 Wayland Young, 2nd Baron Kennet
 Ian Winterbottom, Baron Winterbottom
 Michael Young, Baron Young of Dartington

Much of the party's initial public membership came from the Social Democratic Alliance. The party also received a boost with the recruitment of former student leaders from outside the Labour Party. These included former Communist Party of Great Britain member Sue Slipman as well as Conservative Party members including: Adair Turner and Tom Hayhoe.

Although the SDP was seen as being largely a breakaway from the right-wing of the Labour Party, an internal party survey found that 60% of its members had not belonged to a political party before, with 25% being drawn from Labour, 10% from the Conservatives and 5% from the Liberals.

The party enjoyed a considerable honeymoon period with the press, who made much mileage out of their quirk for proffering claret at their functions. Claret is an "agreeable" wine, and a metaphor for the party's harmonious internal relations compared to those of the strife-torn Labour Party of the period.

The policies of the SDP emphasised a middle position between perceived extremes of Thatcherism and the Labour Party. Its constitution argued for "the fostering of a strong public sector and a strong private sector without frequent frontier changes". The SDP favoured some neoliberal Thatcherite reforms during the 1980s, such as legislation aimed at reforming the trade unions (although the parliamentary SDP actually split three ways on Norman Tebbit's 1982 Industrial Relations Bill, most voting for, some against, and others abstaining), but took a more welfarist position than the Conservative Party, being more sceptical of Conservative welfare reforms (particularly regarding the National Health Service).

At the party's first electoral contest, Jenkins narrowly failed to win a by-election at Warrington in July 1981, describing it as his "first defeat, but by far my greatest victory". At the Glasgow Hillhead by-election in March 1982, another candidate called Douglas Parkin, nominated by a party called the Social Democratic Party which had been formed in Manchester in 1979, changed his name to Roy Harold Jenkins to contest the seat. SDP polling agents were given special dispensation by the Returning Officer to have placards outside of polling stations to state which one on the ballot papers was the real Roy. Ultimately, the SDP's Jenkins was elected.

A leadership election was held later in the year, Jenkins beating Owen in the ballot to become the first leader of the new party. Later in the year, Shirley Williams defeated Bill Rodgers in the ballot to become SDP president.

The Alliance
The SDP formed the SDP–Liberal Alliance with the Liberal Party in June 1981, under the joint leadership of Roy Jenkins (SDP) and Liberal leader David Steel. The Liberal Party, and in particular its leader, David Steel, had applauded the formation of the SDP from the sidelines from the very start. Senior Liberal MP for Rochdale Cyril Smith caused some embarrassment, however, by publicly stating that the SDP "should be strangled at birth". During an era of public disillusionment with the two main parties  – Labour and the Conservatives – and widescale unemployment, the Alliance achieved considerable success at parliamentary by-elections. At one point in late-1981, the party had an opinion poll rating of over 50%.

Also in 1981, David Steel was able to address the Liberal Party conference with the phrase "Go back to your constituencies, and prepare for government!"

In early-1982, after public disagreements over who could fight which seats in the forthcoming election, the poll rating dipped, but the party remained ahead of both Labour and the Conservatives. However, following the outbreak of the Falklands War on 2 April 1982, the Conservative government of Margaret Thatcher soared from third to first place in the public opinion polls. The standing of the SDP–Liberal Alliance and Labour Party declined. By this stage, however, the SDP–Liberal Alliance already had 30 MPs in parliament, virtually all of them defectors from Labour, joined by one Conservative MP.

Labour lost Bermondsey, one of their ten safest seats, at a by-election in February 1983 to Liberal candidate Simon Hughes: the sitting Labour MP Robert Mellish resigned to work for the London Docklands Development Corporation but, being opposed to the selection by his left-wing Constituency Labour Party of Peter Tatchell, supported the former leader of Southwark council John O'Grady as "Real Bermondsey Labour" giving an impression of Labour division and in-fighting.

At the 1983 general election, the SDP–Liberal Alliance won more than 25% of the national vote, close behind Labour's 28%, but well behind the 44% secured by the Conservatives. However, because of the characteristics of the first-past-the-post electoral system used in the United Kingdom, only 23 Alliance MPs were elected, just six of whom were members of the SDP. The party's leader, Roy Jenkins, managed to retain his seat at Glasgow Hillhead, but SDP President Shirley Williams was defeated at Crosby (which she had won at a by-election in November 1981) as a result of unfavourable boundary changes. Labour Party leader Michael Foot, who resigned within days of the election, was critical of the SDP–Liberal Alliance for siphoning support away from Labour, allowing the Conservatives to win more seats and secure a triple-digit majority, while Labour was left with 209 seats in Parliament.

The MP for Plymouth Devonport, Dr. David Owen (who had been a Labour Government Minister under Harold Wilson and James Callaghan between 1974 and 1979), took over as SDP leader after the 1983 general election. He was more sceptical about close relations with the Liberals than his predecessor Roy Jenkins, and favoured retaining the party's distinct identity. Owen's influence ensured that proposals for a merger between the two parties were shelved after a lengthy debate at the 1983 SDP conference.

During the 1983–87 parliament, some SDP members started to become unsettled at what appeared to be the increasingly right-wing course taken by SDP leader David Owen. This resulted in some members launching the Limehouse Group in an attempt to keep the party on the centre-left course that was first propounded in the Limehouse Declaration.

Two more SDP MPs were elected at by-elections during the 1983–87 parliament, but at the 1987 general election, the Alliance's share of the vote fell to 23%, and the SDP's parliamentary party was reduced from eight members to five. Roy Jenkins was among those who lost their seats. Mike Hancock had won a by-election at Portsmouth South in 1984 from the Conservatives which was lost in 1987, but Rosie Barnes, who had won the bitterly contested Greenwich by-election in February 1987 from Labour; managed to hold on at the general election in June that year.

From the outset, the formation of the Alliance had raised questions as to whether it would lead to a merged party, or the two parties were destined to compete with each other. This in turn led to grassroots tensions in some areas between Liberal and SDP branches that impaired their ability to mount joint campaigns successfully. Such cross-party feuding was part of the reason for Jenkins losing his Glasgow Hillhead seat to George Galloway of the Labour Party in 1987.

Liberal pride was further damaged by the sustained lampooning of the Alliance by ITV's popular Spitting Image satirical puppet comedy programme, which portrayed Steel as the craven lickspittle of Owen; One sketch had Owen proposing to a simpering Steel that the parties merged under a new name: "and for our side we'll take 'Social Democratic', and from your side, we'll take 'Party'"; and indeed a new leader "from your side we will take 'David' and from ours 'Owen'", to which a hesitant Steel agreed.

Merger, disestablishment and splits
After the disappointment of 1987, Steel proposed a formal merger of the two parties.  Jenkins and Steel had believed this to be eventually inevitable after the party failed to break through at the 1983 election.  The proposal, also supported by Williams and Rodgers, was fiercely opposed by Owen, who argued that such a merger would not be accepted by the electorate, and would not reverse their declining share of the vote.  Jenkins denied that a merger had been his original intent.

But the majority of the SDP's membership (along with those of the Liberals) voted in favour of the union. Owen resigned as leader and was replaced by Robert Maclennan. Steel and Maclennan headed the new "Social and Liberal Democrats" party from 3 March 1988. An interim working name for the party, the "Democrats", was adopted by conference on 26 September 1988. This proved to be unpopular, and the party was renamed the Liberal Democrats in October 1989, as had been originally proposed at the September 1988 conference by the party's Tiverton branch.

Most SDP members, including SDP MP and future Liberal Democrat leader Charles Kennedy, joined Maclennan in the merged party, but Owen created a continuing SDP, along with two other MPs, John Cartwright and Rosie Barnes. This party performed poorly at the May 1990 by-election in Bootle, behind the Monster Raving Loony Party. It subsequently disbanded, although a third SDP was formed, which currently operates on a much less influential scale. There was also a continuing Liberal Party, led by Michael Meadowcroft and David Morrish, mainly based on Liverpool and West Country Liberals who feared a dilution by the former SDP members of the Liberal tradition within the merged party. It too continues in the present day, as one of the smallest political parties with elected representatives.

Following the dissolution of the SDP, a number of members endorsed Conservative Prime Minister John Major for the 1992 general election.

Election results

Leaders of the SDP

See also

 Change UK
 Social Democratic Party election results

Further reading

Journal of Liberal History, Issue 39 Summer 2003, A Short History of Political Virginity (edition devoted to the SDP)
 Journal of Liberal History, Issue 18 Spring 1998, Ten Years On, The Legacy of the Alliance and Merger

References

External links

 
1981 establishments in the United Kingdom
1988 disestablishments in the United Kingdom
Centre-left parties in the United Kingdom
Centrist political parties in the United Kingdom
Liberal parties in the United Kingdom
Political schisms
Social liberal parties